The 21st Oregon Legislative Assembly had its regular session in 1901. The meeting took place between January 14 and March 4, 1901.

Members of the House

Members of the Senate

References 

Oregon legislative sessions
1901 in Oregon
1902 in Oregon
1901 U.S. legislative sessions
1902 U.S. legislative sessions